Florence Lindon-Travers, known professionally as Linden Travers (27 May 1913 – 23 October 2001), was a British actress.

Life and career
Travers was born in Houghton-le-Spring, County Durham, the daughter of Florence (née Wheatley) and William Halton Lindon-Travers. She was the elder sister of Bill Travers, and attended La Sagesse. She made her first stage appearance at the Newcastle Playhouse in 1933. She made her West End debut the following year in Ivor Novello's Murder in Mayfair, and appeared in her first film, Children of the Fog in 1935.

She played a substantial role in Carol Reed’s Bank Holiday (1938). One of her most widely seen performances was as "Mrs." Todhunter in Alfred Hitchcock's The Lady Vanishes (1938). She also appeared in The Stars Look Down (1940) The Ghost Train (1941), and Quartet (1948).

Her career consisted mainly of supporting roles, but she also played occasional lead roles, such as Miss Blandish in both the well received 1942 stage adaptation in which she starred with Robert Newton which had 203 performances at the Prince of Wales Theatre, London and the widely panned 1948 film version of James Hadley Chase's 1939 novel No Orchids for Miss Blandish. She retired in 1948, after her second marriage. In 1999, she took part in the television programme Reputations: Alfred Hitchcock, paying tribute to the man who had directed her sixty years earlier.

She died in Cornwall, aged 88, in 2001. Her daughter Susan Travers and granddaughter Charlotte Lucas also became actresses.

Filmography

 Children of the Fog (1935)
 Wednesday's Luck (1936)
 Double Alibi (1937)
 London Melody (1937)
 Against the Tide (1937)
 The Last Adventurers (1937)
 Brief Ecstasy (1937)
 Bank Holiday (1938)
 The Terror (1938)
 The Lady Vanishes (1938)
 Almost a Honeymoon (1938)
 Inspector Hornleigh on Holiday (1939)
 The Stars Look Down (1940)
 The Ghost Train (1941)
 South American George (1941)
 The Missing Million (1942)
 The Seventh Survivor (1942)
 Beware of Pity (1946)
 Jassy (1947)
 Master of Bankdam (1947)
 Quartet (1948)
 No Orchids for Miss Blandish (1948)
 The Bad Lord Byron (1949)
 Christopher Columbus (1949)
 Don't Ever Leave Me (1949)
 The Vise (1955, TV series)
 Sea Hunt (1960, TV series)

References

External links

Ancestry of Linden Travers

English film actresses
English stage actresses
People from Houghton-le-Spring
Actresses from Tyne and Wear
1913 births
2001 deaths